The 2009 Boise State Broncos football team represented Boise State University in the 2009 NCAA Division I FBS football season. The Broncos played their home games at Bronco Stadium, most famous for its blue artificial turf surface, often referred to as the "smurf-turf". They completed the regular season undefeated (13–0), their second consecutive unbeaten regular season and fourth in the last six years (2004, 2006, 2008, 2009), and won the WAC title for the seventh time in the last eight years. The Broncos capped their season with a showdown against fellow unbeaten TCU in the 2010 Fiesta Bowl, which marked the Broncos' return to the site of the game that put the program on the national sports map, the 2007 Fiesta Bowl. With their 17–10 win, the Broncos avenged a loss to the Horned Frogs in the previous season's Poinsettia Bowl, and became only the second team in Division I FBS history to finish a season 14–0, after Ohio State in 2002 (Alabama became the third team to go 14–0 just three days after the Fiesta Bowl). The Broncos finished ranked #4 in the Associated Press and USA Today coaches poll for their highest ranking in school history to finish a season.

Head Coach Chris Petersen was named the Paul "Bear" Bryant National Coach of the Year, an award he also won following the 2006 season. Petersen is the first two-time winner of the award since it was renamed in 1986.

Previous season
The Broncos were one of only two teams (the other being the Utah Utes) to finish the 2008 regular season with an undefeated record and win their sixth WAC Championship in seven years. However, The Broncos were unable to finish the season undefeated after losing 17–16 to #11 TCU in the San Diego County Credit Union Poinsettia Bowl.

Pre-season
The Broncos entered the 2009 season as one of the youngest college teams in the nation, with only five seniors on their roster, easily the fewest in FBS. No other team had fewer than nine.

Two Broncos were listed on scout.com's list of the 100 best returning players in the nation. Senior defensive back Kyle Wilson at #54 (#5 best DB) and sophomore quarterback Kellen Moore at #37 (#11 best QB).

All-American lists
Kyle Wilson (Sr.-DB)- Playboy, nationalchamps.net 2nd team, CBSSports.com. 2nd team

Award Watch lists
Rimington- Thomas Byrd (So-C)

Lombardi- Ryan Winterswyk (Jr-DL)

O'Brien- Kellen Moore (So-QB)

Walter Camp- Kellen Moore (So-QB)

Thorpe- Kyle Wilson (Sr-DB)

Groza- Kyle Brotzman (Jr-K)

Bednarik- Kyle Wilson (Sr-DB)

Maxwell- Kellen Moore (So-QB)

Manning- Kellen Moore (So-QB)

Nagurski- Kyle Wilson (Sr-DB)

Pre-season Top 25 polls
On August 6 Boise State received 542 points to rank 16th in the USA Today preseason poll, two spots behind their season opening opponent, Oregon. The Broncos were the highest rated non BCS conference school.

On August 22 Boise State received 659 points to rank 14th in the Associated Press preseason poll, two spots ahead of Oregon. Just as they were in the USA Today poll, the Broncos were the highest rated non BCS conference school. The 14th ranking was the highest preseason ranking in school history.

WAC Media Day

On July 29, Boise State was picked to win the WAC and received 8 first place votes in the WAC coaches poll to 1 first place vote for Nevada, but no coach can vote his own team in first place, thus Boise State received all 8 possible first place votes.

Boise State (8) 64
Nevada (1) 55
Fresno State 45
Louisiana Tech 45
Hawaii 36
San Jose State 34
Utah State 21
New Mexico State 13
Idaho 11

The media also voted Boise State to win the conference with the Broncos receiving 55 first place votes to only 3 for Nevada.

 Boise State (55) 519
 Nevada (3) 444
 Fresno State 365
 Louisiana Tech 360
 Hawaii 275
 San Jose State 263
 Utah State 170
 Idaho 110
 New Mexico State 104

And Kyle Wilson was named the preseason Defensive Player of the Year.

South endzone bleacher expansion
For the second consecutive year Bronco Stadium received an expansion, this time in the south endzone temporary bleachers. Following the multimillion-dollar sky box expansion which opened in 2008, the sub-million dollar bleacher expansion extends the number of rows in the south endzone and adds an additional 1,600 seats to the stadium capacity, which is now 33,500.

Schedule

Game results
Rankings reflect the Coaches poll until the week of the Hawaii game, after which the BCS poll was used, and are from the respective poll released prior to game time.

Oregon

2nd meeting. 1–0 all time. Last meeting in 2008, a 37–32 Broncos win in Eugene.

On August 31, this game was named the Allstate Sugar Bowl Manning Award Matchup of the Week for the matchup of Boise State QB Kellen Moore vs Oregon QB Jeremiah Masoli.

The Broncos won their 50th straight regular season home game, and the first ever at home against a top 25 team, with a 19–8 win over the Oregon Ducks, the second straight year the Broncos have beaten the highly ranked Pac-10 team. The Bronco defense completely shut down the fast-paced spread option offense of Oregon holding them to six first half three and outs, forced a safety in the second quarter, did not allow a first down until 7:07 left in the third quarter and only allowed six overall, and only allowed 31 rushing yards. The Bronco offense scored on a 10-yard TD pass from Kellen Moore to Austin Pettis in the second quarter (Michael Choate 2pt conv.), a D.J. Harper 1 yard TD run in the third (conv. failed), and a 45-yard Kyle Brotzman field goal, but missed several other opportunities to score with two missed field goals, another failed on a bad snap, and three straight fumbles in the second half. The Broncos set a school record with 59 rushing attempts. Kellen Moore finished 19/29 for 197 and 1 TD. Austin Pettis had 6 catches for 68 yards and the TD. The Broncos out gained the Ducks 351 to 152. The 34,127 in attendance set a new Bronco Stadium record. The Broncos moved up 2 spots in the AP poll to #12 and 5 spots in the Coaches poll to #11.

2nd Quarter
 07:05 BSU–Austin Pettis 10 Yd Pass From Kellen Moore (Michael Choate Run For Two–Point Conversion) 0–8
 03:54 BSU–LeGarrette Blount Tackled By Billy Winn In End Zone Safety 0–10
 00:56 BSU–Kyle Brotzman 45 Yd FG 0–13

3rd Quarter
 10:39 BSU–D.J. Harper 1 Yd Run (Two–Point Pass Conversion Failed) 0–19
 04:21 ORE–Jeremiah Masoli 5 Yd Run (Legarrette Blount Run For Two–Point Conversion) 8–19

After the game, Oregon RB LeGarrette Blount, who earlier in the week was quoted as saying, "We owe that team an ass-whuppin," punched Bronco DE Byron Hout in the chin/jaw after Hout had taunted him in front of Boise State head coach Chris Petersen who attempted to move Hout away from Blount before the hit. Blount then went after fans in the front row of the south end zone before being restrained and escorted off the field by security, police, Oregon coaches, and players. Blount was later suspended by the University of Oregon for the entire season (Blount would return to action in the Ducks season finale on December 3, 90 days after the Boise State incident). Blount issued an apology to everyone: the fans, the nation, and Boise State. Hout was not suspended. Head Coach Chris Petersen released the following statement: "The event that took place last night following our game between Byron and Oregon running back LeGarrette Blount was very unfortunate and we do not condone Byron's action. There will be disciplinary consequences for Bryon as a result of the incident last night and they will be handled internally."

Miami (OH)

First ever meeting. The RedHawks are scheduled to return to Boise in 2012. There are currently no future plans for Boise to play at Miami.

Boise State shutout a non-conference FBS school for the first time in school history by dominating Miami (OH) 48–0. The Broncos outgained the RedHawks 441 to 197. Kellen Moore went over 300 yards for the fifth time in his career and threw 4 touchdowns for the first time in his career. Austin Pettis and Titus Young both had over 110 yards receiving with longs of over 50 each and 3 combined touchdowns. The Broncos held their opponent to less than 40 yards rushing for the second consecutive week (Oregon: 31, Miami: 38) and forced 4 interceptions (Iloka, Johnson, Smith, Tevis). When asked about stopping the run, safety Jeron Johnson said, "That's the key to our defense is to stop the run game and make them pass. We have a good secondary so we feel that we can hold our own in the passing game. If we can stop the run, we'll be in good shape". Kyle Brotzman missed his first ever extra point, ending his school record for consecutive PAT's at 118. The Broncos moved to #10 in both major polls following the win.

1st Quarter
 07:16 BSU–Austin Pettis 17 Yd Pass From Kellen Moore (Kyle Brotzman Kick) 0–7
 01:17 BSU–Tyler Shoemaker 15 Yd Pass From Kellen Moore (Kyle Brotzman Kick) 0–14

2nd Quarter 
 00:08 BSU–Titus Young 25 Yd Pass From Kellen Moore (Pat Failed) 0–20

3rd Quarter
 07:09 BSU–D.J. Harper 3 Yd Run (Kyle Brotzman Kick) 0–27
 02:11 BSU–Titus Young 54 Yd Pass From Kellen Moore (Kyle Brotzman Kick) 0–34

4th Quarter
 09:46 BSU–Doug Martin 4 Yd Run (Kyle Brotzman Kick) 0–41
 01:56 BSU–Doug Martin 2 Yd Run (Jimmy Pavel Kick) 0–48

Fresno State

12th meeting. 7–4 all time. Last meeting in 2008, a 61–10 Broncos win in Boise.

An offensive explosion occurred in Fresno with the Broncos and Bulldogs combining for 987 yards, 1494 yards including return yards in a 51–34 Bronco win. Winston Venable opened the scoring with a 30-yard interception return for a touchdown on the Bulldogs opening drive. The Broncos would follow with a 32-yard Kyle Brotzman field goal to go up 10–0. A 60-yard touchdown run by D.J. Harper on the Broncos next possession was just a sampling of the fireworks that would follow. After a Fresno State field goal, Titus Young returned the following kickoff 77 yards to set up a 7-yard touchdown catch to him from Kelln Moore. The Broncos looked to be in complete control of the game at 24–3, but Ryan Mathews of Fresno State would answer with consecutive 69 and 60 yard touchdown runs to bring the Bulldogs within 7 at the half. The Broncos returned the opening kickoff of the 2nd half for a touchdown only to see it overturned on offsetting penalties for a block in the back and a personal foul, but Doug Martin would return the next kick 77 yards to set up a Brotzman field goal. The Bulldogs would drive and score a touchdown to bring the score to 27–24. The Broncos would follow with a 74-yard Jeremy Avery rush which was fumbled at the 1 yard line but recovered in the end zone for a Bronco touchdown by Titus Young. Fresno answered with a 17-play drive ending with a 27-yard field goal to end the 3rd quarter with a score of 34–27. In the first two minutes of the 4th quarter, Kellen Moore connected with Austin Pettis for an 8-yard touchdown catch, Ryan Mathews broke his third 60+ yard touchdown run of the night, this time 68 yards, then Jeremy Avery scored on a 67-yard screen pass to bring the score to 48–34. Following a 69-yard Jeremy Avery rush the Broncos added a late 24-yard field goal by Jimmy Pavel to end the scoring. The Broncos and Bulldogs combined for 8 plays of 60 yards or more with 2 being over 70. Despite the 17-point win, the Broncos gave up 507 yards. Boise State moved to #8 in both major polls, their highest regular-season ranking in school history to date.

1st Quarter
 13:05 BSU–Winston Venable 30 Yd Interception Return (Kyle Brotzman kick) 7–0
 08:49 BSU–Kyle Brotzman 32 Yd FG 10–0

2nd Quarter
 12:28 BSU–D.J. Harper 60 Yd Run (Kyle Brotzman Kick) 17–0
 09:44 FRES–Kevin Goessling 37 Yd FG 17–3
 07:49 BSU–Titus Young 7 Yd Pass From Kellen Moore (Kyle Brotzman Kick) 24–3
 07:33 FRES–Ryan Mathews 69 Yd Run (Kevin Goessling Kick) 24–10
 04:58 FRES–Ryan Mathews 60 Yd Run (Kevin Goessling Kick) 24–17

3rd Quarter
 12:28 BSU–Kyle Brotzman 30 Yd FG 27–17
 11:39 FRES–Devon Wylie 21 Yd Pass From Ryan Colburn (Kevin Goessling Kick)  27–24
 10:44 BSU–Titus Young Recovered Fumble In End Zone (Kyle Brotzman Kick) 34–24
 03:12 FRES–Kevin Goessling 27 Yd FG 34–27

4th Quarter
 14:14 BSU–Austin Pettis 8 yd pass From Kellen Moore (Jimmy Pavel Kick) 41–27
 13:26 FRES–Ryan Mathews 68 yd run (Kevin Goessling Kick) 41–34
 13:00 BSU–Jeremy Avery 67 yd pass From Kellen Moore (Jimmy Pavel Kick) 48–34
 04:00 BSU–Jimmy Pavel 24 yd FG 51–34

Both Fresno State and Boise State wore "D.B." decals on their helmets to honor Dan Brown, former Boise State linebacker (1978–1981) and former Fresno State defensive coordinator (2002–2008), who died from brain cancer on March 15, 2009. Junior wide receiver Titus Young was selected as the WAC Special Teams Player of the Week for returning five kickoffs for 154 yards with a long of 77. Junior running back D.J. Harper, the Broncos leading rusher through three games, tore his left ACL against Fresno State and missed the rest of the season. Harper applied for, and was granted, a medical redshirt.

Bowling Green

3rd meeting. 2–0 all time. Last meeting in 2008, a 20–7 Broncos win in Boise.

The Broncos made a rare trip to the Eastern time zone and walked away with a victory against a MAC team for the second time this season with a 49–14 win over Bowling Green. After a scoreless first quarter, the Broncos ran off 22 points in a span of 2:47 in the second quarter with two Titus Young TD runs (18, 25) and a Doug Martin TD run (34). The Broncos first six scoring drives all took only four plays or less. Kellen Moore threw for 195 yards in the second quarter and finished 17/21 for 247 and 2 TDs before leaving the game midway through the third quarter. Jeremy Avery got his first rushing TD of the season in impressive fashion with a 71-yard run in the third. The Broncos gained a total of 529 yards. The Broncos once again set a school record by climbing to #5 in all major polls, including the Harris poll which debuted this week.

2nd Quarter
 14:53 BSU–Titus Young 18 Yd Run (Austin Pettis Pass To Richie Brockel For Two–Point Conversion) 8–0
 12:45 BSU–Doug Martin 34 Yd Run (Kyle Brotzman Kick) 15–0
 12:27 BSU–Titus Young 25 Yd Run (Kyle Brotzman Kick) 22–0
 02:15 BSU–Austin Pettis 17 Yd Pass From Kellen Moore (Kyle Brotzman Kick) 29–0

3rd Quarter
 14:27 BSU–Jeremy Avery 71 Yd Run (Kyle Brotzman Kick) 36–0
 13:41 BSU–Richie Brockel 2 Yd Pass From Kellen Moore (Kyle Brotzman Kick) 43–0
 07:46 BGSU–Adrian Hodges 7 Yd Pass From Tyler Sheehan (Jerry Phillips Kick) 43–7
 01:01 BGSU–Tyler Sheehan 6 Yd Run (Jerry Phillips Kick) 43–14

4th Quarter
 06:11 BSU–Jarvis Hodge 1 Yd Run (Pat Failed) 49–14

UC Davis

4th meeting. 3–0 all time. Last meeting 1985, a 13–9 Broncos win in Boise. Boise State head coach Chris Petersen was quarterback for UC Davis in the last meeting.

It was a game that was much closer than was expected as UC Davis of the FCS gave the Broncos all they could handle in a 34–16 Bronco win in a cold, rain-soaked, tension-filled Bronco Stadium. The Aggies held the Broncos scoreless in the first quarter and held them on a 4th and goal at the 1 yard line to give them momentum for the rest of the game. The Broncos did manage to be up 13–0 at half time on two Kyle Brotzman FGs and a Kellen Moore to Austin Pettis TD pass, but UC Davis hung close in the second half with scores of 20–10 and 27–16 before a late Doug Martin TD sealed the win for the Broncos. Austin Pettis had a career-high of 10 receptions for 129 yards and two TDs. Ryan Winterswyk recorded a sack for the third straight game and blocked a field goal right before halftime. The Bronco defense was without their captain Kyle Wilson who missed the game with a shoulder injury. The lackluster performance by the Broncos contributed to them dropping in the AP and Coaches polls to #6, but they did remain #5 in the Harris poll.

2nd Quarter
 10:17 BSU–Kyle Brotzman 22 Yd FG 0–3
 04:36 BSU–Kyle Brotzman 36 Yd FG 0–6
 00:52 BSU–Austin Pettis 6 Yd Pass From Kellen Moore (Kyle Brotzman Kick) 0–13

3rd Quarter
 12:40 UCD–Sean Kelley 48 yd FG 3–13
 11:51 BSU–Titus Young 42 yd Pass From Kellen Moore (Kyle Brotzman Kick) 3–20
 09:20 UCD–Sean Creadick 21 yd Pass From Greg Denham (Sean Kelley Kick) 10–20
 03:33 BSU–Austin Pettis 2 yd Pass From Kellen Moore (Kyle Brotzman Kick) 10–27

4th Quarter
 11:27 UCD–Sean Creadick 4 Yd Pass From Greg Denham (Pat Failed) 16–27
 00:38 BSU–Doug Martin 4 Yd Run (Kyle Brotzman Kick) 16–34

Following their bye week the Broncos moved back to #5 in the AP poll and remained at #6 in the Coaches poll and #5 in the Harris poll.

Tulsa

5th meeting. 4–0 all time. Last meeting in 2004, a 45–42 Broncos win in Tulsa. Tulsa is scheduled to play at Boise in 2011.

Big plays kept Tulsa in the game, but the Broncos were able to hang on to remain undefeated with a 28–21 win. The Broncos gave up points in the 1st quarter for the first time this season and had their first deficit of the season. Tulsa connected on long TD passes of 55 and 53 yards. The Broncos tried to answer with their own big plays, but could not connect twice on long passes to Titus Young. Instead the Broncos moved the ball with a steady dose of Doug Martin (112 YDS) and Jeremy Avery (73 YDS) on the ground to set up 3 short Kellen Moore TD passes (8,17,2), 2 to Tommy Gallarda. Tulsa held the Broncos in the redzone twice leading to 2 Kyle Brotzman field goals (27,18). Tulsa had the ball with a chance to score to tie the game but were unable to convert on a 4th down with 37 seconds to play. The Bronco defense came up with 13 tackles for loss and 5 sacks, 2 by Ryan Winterswyk, bringing his season total to 5. The Broncos would fall in the AP poll to #6 but rose to #5 in the Coaches poll and debuted at #4 in the BCS poll, their highest ranking in any major poll in school history.

1st Quarter
 08:25 TLSA–Damaris Johnson 53 Yd Pass From A.J. Whitmore (Kevin Fitzpatrick Kick) 0–7
 04:00 BSU–Tommy Gallarda 8 Yd Pass From Kellen Moore (Austin Pettis Pass To Kyle Efaw For Two–Point Conversion) 8–7
 00:16 TLSA–Trae Johnson 15 Yd Pass From G.J. Kinne (Kevin Fitzpatrick Kick) 8–14

2nd Quarter
 11:03 BSU–Austin Pettis 17 Yd Pass From Kellen Moore (Kyle Brotzman Kick) 15–14
 00:36 BSU–Kyle Brotzman 27 Yd FG 18–14

3rd Quarter
 09:44 BSU–Tommy Gallarda 2 Yd Pass From Kellen Moore (Kyle Brotzman Kick) 25–14
 02:54 BSU–Kyle Brotzman 18 Yd FG 28–14

4th Quarter
 09:29 TLSA–Slick Shelley 55 Yd Pass From G.J. Kinne (Kevin Fitzpatrick Kick) 28–21

Hawaii

11th meeting. 7–3 all time. Last meeting in 2008, a 27–7 Broncos win in Boise.

Boise State had lost their last two trips to the islands in 2007, but this game was never in doubt as the Broncos beat the Warriors for the 8th time in 9 years as a member of the WAC. Kellen Moore had a career-high 5 TD passes (35, 14, 24, 10, 48) going 18/30 for 223 yards. Titus Young caught 8 passes for 115 yards and 3 TDS. Freshman running back Matt Kaiserman, who had been hurt the entire season, made his Bronco debut and ran for 122 yards, 51 of those on the Broncos final drive alone where he carried the ball on all 11 plays to lead to his first career TD. The score could have been much worse than it was, but Hawaii was able to force the Broncos to attempt 5 field goals, 4 of which Kyle Brotzman made (25, 28, 32, 27). The Bronco defence force 3 INTS, 2 by Jeron Johnson, and 3 fumble recoveries. The Broncos did continue to have center to quarterback exchange problems which led to 6 fumbles, all of which they did recover, and center Thomas Byrd was replaced by Garret Pendergast, but Pendergast snapped a ball into the end zone which led to a Hawaii safety. The Broncos remained the same in the AP (#6) and the two human BCS polls (Coaches #5, Harris #5), but their BCS computer poll average fell from #5 to #8 to bring their BCS ranking to #7.

1st Quarter
 11:54 BSU–Kyle Brotzman 25 Yd FG 3–0
 07:08	BSU–Tyler Shoemaker 35 Yd Pass From Kellen Moore (Kyle Brotzman Kick) 10–0

2nd Quarter
 13:32	BSU–Austin Pettis 14 Yd Pass From Kellen Moore (Kyle Brotzman Kick) 17–0
 07:33	BSU–Titus Young 24 Yd Pass From Kellen Moore (Kyle Brotzman Kick) 24–0
 01:22	BSU–Titus Young 10 Yd Pass From Kellen Moore (Kyle Brotzman Kick) 31–0
 00:17	BSU–Kyle Brotzman 28 Yd FG 34–0

3rd Quarter
 08:02	BSU–Kyle Brotzman 32 Yd FG 37–0
 06:59	BSU–Titus Young 48 Yd Pass From Kellen Moore (Kyle Brotzman Kick) 44–0
 05:52	HAW–Kellen Moore Tackled By Team In End Zone (Safety) 44–2

4th Quarter
 14:54	BSU–Kyle Brotzman 27 Yd FG 47–2
 09:50	HAW–Jon Medeiros 10 Yd Pass From Shane Austin (Scott Enos Kick) 47–9
 03:08	BSU–Matt Kaiserman 1 Yd Run (Kyle Brotzman Kick) 54–9

On October 26 Jeron Johnson was named the WAC defensive player of the week for his 2 interceptions and 1 fumble recovery and Kyle Brotzman was named the WAC special teams player of the week for going 4–5 on field goals and having a 72-yard punt, which is the longest punt in the WAC so far this season. Brotzman also completed a 28-yard pass on a fake punt.

San Jose State

10th meeting. 9–0 all time. Last meeting in 2008, a 33–16 Broncos win in San Jose. 

The Broncos cruised to their 20th straight regular season win to remain undefeated on the season with a 45–7 win over San Jose State. The Broncos opened the game with a 61-yard touchdown pass from Kellen Moore to his brother Kirby Moore for Kirby's first career TD. When asked about the brother to brother connection, Boise State head coach Chris Petersen said, "When that happened on the sideline, I think everyone just had a smile on their face. It's so hard to play
Division I football and then to be able to do that with your brother is something that is really special. I just
think that that's a special thing to play college football with your brother, and when you hook up for a big play
like that, and hopefully they'll be many more down the road." Boise State led only 10–7 with less the a minute left in the 1st half until Kellen Moore found Mitch Burroughs on an 18-yard TD pass then scored on a Moore 1 yard TD run after a San Jose fumble to lead 24–7 at halftime. Austin Pettis caught an 8-yard TD pass to open the 3rd quarter and now has a touchdown reception in all 8 games this season. Kyle Wilson returned an interception 27 yards for the defence's 2nd TD of the year. A late Doug Martin TD run capped off the Bronco scoring. Kellen Moore added 3 more TD passes and now has 24 with only 2 INT's. The Broncos moved up in the AP (#5) and Harris polls (#4 including 1 first place vote) and remained the same in the Coache's (#5) and BCS (#7).

1st Quarter
 09:32 BSU–Kirby Moore 61 Yd Pass From Kellen Moore (Kyle Brotzman Kick) 0–7

2nd Quarter
 11:28 SJSU–Marquis Avery 11 Yd Pass From Jordan La Secla (Tyler Cope Kick) 7–7
 07:00 BSU–Kyle Brotzman 32 Yd FG 7–10
 00:44 BSU–Mitch Burroughs 18 Yd Pass From Kellen Moore (Kyle Brotzman Kick) 7–17
 00:03 BSU–Kellen Moore 1 Yd Run (Kyle Brotzman Kick) 7–24

3rd Quarter
 10:22 BSU–Austin Pettis 8 Yd Pass From Kellen Moore (Kyle Brotzman Kick) 7–31
 09:26 BSU–Kyle Wilson 27 Yd Interception Return (Kyle Brotzman Kick) 7–38

4th Quarter
 00:20 BSU–Doug Martin 36 Yd Run (Kyle Brotzman Kick) 7–45

On November 2, Kyle Wilson was named the WAC defensive player of the week after his first career interception return for a touchdown and recording 5 tackles with 1 for a loss of 2 yards.

Louisiana Tech

12th meeting. 7–4 all time. Last meeting in 2008, a 35–3 Broncos win in Boise.

Boise State has always played exciting, close games when they travel to Ruston, Louisiana, and 2009 was no different as the Broncos had to hold on late for a 45–35 win against the upset-minded Bulldogs. The Broncos looked as if they were going to run away the game, building a lead of 27–7 at halftime with the help of big plays from Titus Young (40 yard touchdown reception) and Kyle Wilson (59 yard punt return to the 3 to set up a Doug Martin TD). But mistakes loomed large as Kellen Moore was intercepted and returned 75 yards for a TD and Kyle Brotzman missed 2 of his 5 field goals (29, 34, 25 made. 44, 31 missed). Tech got as close as 30–28 before the Kellen Moore connected with Austin Pettis for a 12-yard TD and Jeremy Avery broke a 44-yard TD run to extend the lead to 45–28. Tech would add a late TD to bring final to 45–35. Kellen Moore threw for a season high 354 yards and added 3 more TDs to bring his total to 27 on the season with only 3 INTs. Austin Pettis now has a TD catch in all 9 games this season and has 10 total for the year. Kyle Wilson recorded his second INT in as many weeks. The Broncos would fall in the Coaches, AP and Harris polls but rose one spot in the BCS to now be ranked #6 in every poll. 

1st Quarter
 10:57 BSU–Kyle Brotzman 29 Yd FG 3–0
 08:14 LT–Daniel Porter 1 Yd Run (Matt Nelson Kick) 3–7
 05:03 BSU–Kyle Brotzman 34 Yd FG 6–7
 00:44 BSU–Richie Brockel 2 Yd Pass From Kellen Moore (Kyle Brotzman Kick) 13–7

2nd Quarter
 13:52 BSU–Doug Martin 2 Yd Run (Kyle Brotzman Kick) 20–7
 07:35 BSU–Titus Young 40 Yd Pass From Kellen Moore (Kyle Brotzman Kick) 27–7

3rd Quarter
 13:12 LT–Josh Victorian 75 Yd Interception Return (Matt Nelson Kick) 27–14
 00:31 BSU–Kyle Brotzman 25 Yd FG 30–14
 01:30 LT–Ross Jenkins 9 Yd Run (Matt Nelson Kick) 30–21

4th Quarter
 14:07 LT–Dennis Morris 5 Yd Pass From Ross Jenkins (Matt Nelson Kick) 30–28
 07:41 BSU–Austin Pettis 12 Yd Pass From Kellen Moore (Kellen Moore Pass To Tyler Shoemaker For Two-Point Conversion) 38–28
 04:52 BSU–Jeremy Avery 44 Yd Run (Kyle Brotzman Kick) 45–28
 02:49 LT–Myke Compton 1 Yd Run (Matt Nelson Kick) 45–35

Idaho

39th meeting. 20–17–1 all time. Last meeting in 2008, a 45–10 Broncos win in Moscow.

The Broncos won their 11th straight game against their in-state rival to remain undefeated on the season with a 63–25 win. The Vandals came into the game with high hopes after winning 7 of their first 10 games, but the Broncos ended the Vandals hopes early with 4 first half Kellen Moore TD passes (4, 25, 8, 20), 3 of which went to Austin Pettis. Add a 1 YD TD run by Jeremy Avery and a 100+ yard Titus Young kickoff return for a TD to bring the Broncos lead to 42–17 at halftime. Kyle Wilson opened the second half scoring by returning an INT 71 yards for his second TD return of the season. Matt Kaiserman found Kyle Efaw for an 11 YD halfback pass TD before Moore found Pettis for a TD for the 4th time (14 YDS). Kellen Moore finished 22/32 for 299 and 5 TDS to bring his season total to 32 with only 3 INTS. Austin Pettis finished with 8 Receptions for 123 YDS and 4 TDS, brought his TD streak to 10 games and set a school record with 14 touchdown receptions for the season. The Broncos intercepted Vandal quarterback Brian Reader 5 times and recovered 2 fumbles to record 7 turnovers. The Broncos would remain at #6 in all 4 major polls following the win. 

1st Quarter
 12:11 BSU–Austin Pettis 4 Yd Pass From Kellen Moore (Austin Pettis Pass To Kyle Efaw For Two–Point Conversion) 0–8
 10:46 BSU–Titus Young 25 Yd Pass From Kellen Moore (Two–Point Pass Conversion Failed) 0–14
 06:28 IDHO–DeMaundray Woolridge 29 Yd Run (Trey Farquhar Kick) 7–14
 04:35 BSU–Austin Pettis 8 Yd Pass From Kellen Moore (Kyle Brotzman Kick) 7–21

2nd Quarter
 12:46 IDHO–Trey Farquhar 30 Yd FG 10–21
 09:10 BSU–Jeremy Avery 1 Yd Run (Kyle Brotzman Kick) 10–28
 05:23 BSU–Austin Pettis 20 Yd Pass From Kellen Moore (Kyle Brotzman Kick) 10–35
 00:27 IDHO–DeMaundray Woolridge 1 Yd Run (Trey Farquhar Kick) 17–35
 00:14 BSU–Titus Young 100 Yd Kickoff Return (Kyle Brotzman Kick) 17–42

3rd Quarter
 10:20 BSU–Kyle Wilson 71 Yd Interception Return (Kyle Brotzman Kick) 17–49
 07:12 BSU–Kyle Efaw 11 Yd Pass From Matt Kaiserman (Kyle Brotzman Kick) 17–56

4th Quarter
 14:55 BSU–Austin Pettis 14 Yd Pass From Kellen Moore (Kyle Brotzman Kick) 17–63
 00:27 IDHO–Princeton McCarty 52 Yd Pass From Brian Reader (Deonte' Jackson Run For Two-Point Conversion) 25–63

On November 16 Austin Pettis was named the WAC offensive player of the week and Titus Young was named WAC special teams player of the week. Senior fullback and offensive captain Richie Brockel, one of only five seniors on the roster, missed the remainder of the season with a foot injury. Freshman running back Matt Kaiserman, who had missed the first six games with a concussion, missed the remainder of the season with a broken leg.

Utah State

16th meeting. 11–4 all time. Last meeting in 2008, a 49–14 Broncos win in Boise.

The Broncos opened the season 11–0 for the 4th time in 6 years and their 9th straight win over Utah State with a 52–21 win. The Aggies hung with the Broncos until about 6 minutes left in the first half with the score tied at 14 until the Broncos scored 3 quick TDs to end the half, one after a fumble recovery at the 9 yard line, to lead 35–14 at half. The Aggie pass defense held Kellen Moore to under 60% pass completions for the first time in his career (24 games) going 15/29 (51.7%) for 233 YDs and only 1 TD which ended a streak of 9 straight games with multiple TD passes and 6 straight with 3 or more. The Bronco run game picked up where the passing left off as they racked up a season high 323 YDs with both Doug Martin and Jeremy Avery going over 115 YDs with a combined 6 TDS, 4 for Martin alone. Austin Pettis failed to catch a TD for the first time in a game this season. Kyle Brotzman's 52 yard FG in the 3rd quarter was a career long. The Bronco defense dominated the Aggies forcing 13 TFL of 45 YDs, 4 Sacks and 2 turnovers. Boise State remained at #6 in every major poll for the 3rd straight week. 

1st Quarter
 08:54 BSU–Tommy Gallarda 8 Yd Pass From Kellen Moore (Kyle Brotzman Kick) 7–0
 05:52 USU–Michael Smith 22 Yd Run (Chris Ulinski Kick) 7–7

2nd Quarter
 08:51 BSU–Doug Martin 17 Yd Run (Kyle Brotzman Kick) 14–7
 06:28 USU–Robert Turbin 24 Yd Run (Chris Ulinski Kick) 14–14
 04:47 BSU–Doug Martin 2 Yd Run (Kyle Brotzman Kick) 21–14
 04:04 BSU–Jeremy Avery 9 Yd Run (Kyle Brotzman Kick) 28–14
 00:05 BSU–Doug Martin 1 Yd Run (Kyle Brotzman Kick) 35–14

3rd Quarter
 12:56 BSU–Jeremy Avery 32 Yd Run (Kyle Brotzman Kick) 42–14
 05:49 USU–Michael Smith 12 Yd Run (Chris Ulinski Kick) 42–21
 01:37 BSU–Kyle Brotzman 52 Yd FG 45–21

4th Quarter
 09:49 BSU–Doug Martin 6 Yd Run (Kyle Brotzman Kick) 52–21

On November 23 Doug Martin was named WAC offensive player of the week, the 4th Bronco in the last 3 weeks to be awarded by the WAC, for his performance of 13 CAR for 121 YDs and 4 TDs.

Nevada

36th meeting. 23–12 all time. Last meeting in 2008, a 41–34 Broncos win in Reno.

On November 23, this game was named the Allstate Sugar Bowl Manning Award Matchup of the Week for the matchup of Boise State QB Kellen Moore vs Nevada QB Colin Kaepernick.

Nevada came into the game on an eight-game win streak and 7–0 in the WAC and looked to knock off the Broncos to win the outright WAC championship, but the undefeated Broncos set the tone early and often on their way to at least a share of their seventh WAC title in eight years. Titus Young took the game's opening kickoff 95 yards for a touchdown, his second return TD in three weeks, and the Broncos would add two TD passes to seldom-used fullback Dan Paul to lead 20–0 at the end of the first quarter. After a Wolf Pack field goal, Paul added his third touchdown reception to give the Broncos their largest lead of the game 27–3. Nevada would keep the game close by scoring two TDs before halftime to be down by 11 but could only match the Broncos point for point in the second half to lose 44–33. The Broncos held the nations leading rushing attack to only 242 yards and Kaepernick was held to only 172 total yards. Moore added five more TDs to bring his season total to 38, which set a new school record for TD passes in a season, passing the old record of 35. The Broncos stayed at #6 for the fourth straight week in every major poll and with Oklahoma's win over Oklahoma State, Boise State became the front runner to receive an at large bid to a BCS bowl game.  

1st Quarter
 14:45 BSU–Titus Young 95 Yd Kickoff Return (Kyle Brotzman Kick) 0–7
 09:03 BSU–Dan Paul 18 Yd Pass From Kellen Moore (Two–Point Conversion Failed) 0–13
 04:20 BSU–Dan Paul 3 Yd Pass From Kellen Moore (Kyle Brotzman Kick) 0–20

2nd Quarter
 13:36 NEV–Richard Drake 26 Yd FG 3–20
 09:59 BSU–Dan Paul 1 Yd Pass From Kellen Moore (Kyle Brotzman Kick) 3–27
 03:38 NEV–Virgil Green 6 Yd Pass From Colin Kaepernick (Pat Failed) 9–27
 00:03 NEV–Brandon Wimberly 3 Yd Pass From Colin Kaepernick (Richard Drake Kick) 16–27

3rd Quarter
 09:38 NEV–Richard Drake 37 Yd FG 19–27
 02:40 BSU–Tommy Gallarda 21 Yd Pass From Kellen Moore (Kyle Brotzman Kick) 19–34
 02:23 NEV–Vai Taua 71 Yd Run (Richard Drake Kick) 26–34

4th Quarter
 10:55 BSU–Kyle Brotzman 27 Yd FG 26–37
 05:08 BSU–Kirby Moore 6 Yd Pass From Kellen Moore (Kyle Brotzman Kick) 26–44
 01:16 NEV–Tray Session 23 Yd Pass From Colin Kaepernick (Richard Drake Kick) 33–44

On November 30, wide receiver Titus Young was named the WAC special teams player of the week, marking the third time he has won the award this season. Wide receiver Austin Pettis, who leads the team with 14 TD catches, broke his leg on the Broncos failed two point conversion after their second TD. He did return and played sparingly in the Broncos bowl game. Starting linebacker Daron Mackey tore his ACL and missed the remainder of the season.

New Mexico State

10th meeting. 9–0 all time. Last meeting in 2008, a 49–0 Broncos win in Las Cruces.

Boise State wrapped un another undefeated season and outright WAC title with a 42–7 win over New Mexico State. The Broncos finished the regular season 13–0 for their second consecutive and fourth undefeated regular season in six years. The conference title is their seventh title in nine years as a WAC member and sixth outright title. The win was also the 56th straight game and eighth straight season of being undefeated at home in the regular season (2002–2009).The Broncos opened the scoring with a 47-yard TD pass from Moore to Young, bringing Moore's school record for TD passes in a season to 39. Jeremy Avery and Doug Martin would provide the rest of the scoring combining for 5 TDs (4 for Martin) and 170 yards with Martin breaking a TD run of 56 yards, his season long. Ryan Winterswyk had half a sack to finish the year with a team high 8.5. Brandyn Thompson's INT in the 2nd quarter brought the Bronco total to 21 for the year. Boise State finished the regular season ranked #6 in every major poll, their highest ranking to end a season in school history.

1st Quarter
 03:56 BSU–Titus Young 47 Yd Pass From Kellen Moore (Kyle Brotzman Kick) 0–7

2nd Quarter
 10:32 BSU–Jeremy Avery 9 Yd Run (Kyle Brotzman Kick) 0–14
 07:02 BSU–Doug Martin 4 Yd Run (Kyle Brotzman Kick) 0–21
 00:41 BSU–Doug Martin 4 Yd Run (Kyle Brotzman Kick) 0–28

3rd Quarter 
 07:41 BSU–Doug Martin 2 Yd Run (Kyle Brotzman Kick) 0–35
 03:42 BSU–Doug Martin 56 Yd Run (Kyle Brotzman Kick) 0–42

4th Quarter
 04:32 NMSU–Trevor Walls 1 Yd Run (Kyle Hughes Kick) 7–42

On December 6 the Broncos were selected to play 12–0 and BCS #4 TCU in the Tostitos Fiesta Bowl. This will be Boise State's second BCS appearance with the other being the 2007 Fiesta Bowl. TCU earned the non–automatic qualifiers automatic bid by being the highest ranked team from a non BCS conference. Boise State became the first team from a non BCS conference to earn an at large bid to a BCS bowl. The Fiesta Bowl will also be the first BCS bowl to feature two teams from non-automatic BCS qualifying conferences and the first to feature two undefeated teams outside of the National Championship game.

Fiesta Bowl - TCU

3rd meeting. 1–1 all time. Last meeting in 2008, a 17–16 Horned Frogs win in the Poinsettia Bowl.

The Broncos reached into their bag of tricks once again on the biggest of stages to help pull out a 17–10 victory over TCU to avenge their only loss in the 2008 season and win their second Fiesta Bowl championship. In a game dominated by defense the Broncos would strike first with a Brandyn Thompson 51 yard interception return for a touchdown. Kyle Brotzman, who had earlier in the game missed a 36-yard field goal, connected on a 40-yard field goal to extend the lead to 10–0. TCU's Andy Dalton threw a 30-yard TD pass to Curtis Clay right before halftime to make the score 10–7 at the break. A third quarter 29 yard TCU field goal would tie the game. Both teams went back and forth into the fourth quarter until Boise State pulled off a gutsy call that opened the game up. On fourth and nine on their own 33 yard line the Broncos executed a fake punt for a first down with a 29-yard pass from Kyle Brotzman to Kyle Efaw. Three straight completions by Kellen Moore put the Broncos on the 2 yard line where Doug Martin dove into the endzone for a 17–10 lead. Brotzman came up clutch two more times as he made a touchdown saving tackle on a punt return with about five minutes to play and punted the ball to the one yard line with only 1:06 to play. The Horned Frogs would have had to go 99 yards to tie the game. TCU drove to the Broncos 30 yard line before Dalton was intercepted by Winston Venable to seal the win with 18 seconds to play. Brandyn Thompson was named the game's defensive MVP with 2 interceptions, 1 for a TD, and 7 tackles. Kyle Efaw was named the game's offensive MVP with 4 receptions for 75 yards and caught the pass on the fake punt. The 14 wins is the most in school history and only the second 14–0 season in NCAA history (2002 Ohio State, the winner of the 2010 BCS National Championship, Alabama, also was 14–0).

1st Quarter
 11:28 BSU–Brandyn Thompson 51 Yd Interception Return (Kyle Brotzman Kick) 7–0

2nd Quarter
 08:02 BSU–Kyle Brotzman 40 Yd FG 10–0
 00:49 TCU–Curtis Clay 30 Yd Pass From Andy Dalton (Ross Evans Kick) 10–7

3rd Quarter
 03:52 TCU–Ross Evans 29 Yd FG 10–10

4th Quarter
 07:21 BSU–Doug Martin 2 Yd Run (Kyle Brotzman Kick) 17–10

On January 7, following the National Championship game, the Broncos would finish ranked #4 in the AP and coaches poll, their highest ranking in school history to finish a season (#5 AP and #6 coaches in 2006).

Post-season awards

WAC Coach of the Year
Chris Petersen- 2nd straight year

WAC Offensive Player of the Year
Kellen Moore- So. QB

First Team All WAC
Kellen Moore- So. QB- 2008 2nd team

Austin Pettis- Jr. WR- 2008 2nd team

Titus Young- Jr. WR

Nate Potter- So. OL

Kyle Wilson-Sr. DB- 2nd straight year on the 1st team, 2007 2nd team

Ryan Winterswyk- Jr. DL- 2nd straight year on the 1st team

Titus Young- Jr. ST/KR

Second Team All WAC
Jeremy Avery- Jr. RB

Billy Winn- So. DL

Winston Venable-Jr. LB

Jeron Johnson- Jr. DB- 2008 2nd team

Paul "Bear" Bryant Award
Head Coach Chris Petersen

Rankings

Statistics

Team

Scores by quarter

Offense

Rushing

Passing

Receiving

Defense

Special teams

Scoring

Records
Lowest percentage of passes intercepted, season (over 350 attempts): Kellen Moore, 0.70%

 An NCAA FBS record as of the end of 2014

Expanded WAC standings

Roster
Starters in Bold

Coaching staff

NFL Draft
On April 22, 2010, Sr. Cornerback Kyle Wilson was selected as the 29th overall pick in the first round of the 2010 NFL Draft by the New York Jets. Wilson is just the second Bronco ever taken in the first round of the draft (Ryan Clady 12th overall in 2008). Wilson grew up in Piscataway, New Jersey, which is only about 30 miles from where the Jets play their home games.

References

Boise State
Boise State Broncos football seasons
Western Athletic Conference football champion seasons
Fiesta Bowl champion seasons
College football undefeated seasons
Boise State Broncos football